John Ellis (born 1 June 1952) is an English guitarist and songwriter.

Career
Ellis was a co-founder of the pub rock band Bazooka Joe in 1970 and a founding member of the punk rock band The Vibrators. He formed The Vibrators in 1976 while still at art school studying illustration. The Vibrators released two albums with Ellis and toured extensively. Ellis left the Vibrators in 1978 to form the short-lived group Rapid Eye Movement, before embarking on a solo career in 1979, releasing a couple of singles, one of which, "Babies in Jars" (a live Rapid Eye Movement recording) reached #34 on the UK Indie Chart.

In 1980, Ellis toured with Peter Gabriel on his "Tour of China 1984", and he appears on the album Peter Gabriel 4. From 1982 onwards, he recorded a number of albums with Peter Hammill, and toured with Hammill (off and on) from 1981 until 1989. From 1981 until 1984, he was a member of the K Group with Peter Hammill. Hammill was "K" (on vocals, piano and guitar), Nic Potter was "Mozart" (on bass guitar), Guy Evans was "Brain" (on drums), and Ellis was "Fury" (on backing vocals and guitar). The Peter Hammill album The Margin is a registration of live-concerts by the K group.

Between late 1990 and 2000, Ellis was a member of the band The Stranglers, starting with the album Stranglers in the Night. During that period he also created music for European Art exhibitions and several short films. Ellis left the Stranglers in 2000. He is an exponent of the E-bow guitar.

Ellis has contributed to the recordings of Judge Smith, a founding member of Van der Graaf Generator.

In 2005, Ellis formed a community organisation called 'The Luma Group', that delivers arts based training and workshops.

In 2009, Ellis started his own record label, Chanoyu Records, in order to release his own music. The first release was Wabi Sabi 21©, an album of electronic instrumentals inspired by the Japanese Tea Ceremony.

Discography

Solo
Microgroove (year unknown)
In Rhodt (Gallery Music #1) (1989)
Das Geheimnis Des Golem (Gallery Music #2) (1991)
Destination Everywhere (Gallery Music #3) (1995)
Our Internal Monologue (Gallery Music #4) (1995)
Shock of Contact (Gallery Music #5) (1996)
Acrylic (1997)
Spic 'N' Span (1999)
Map of Limbo (2008) (a free album available at Clinical Archives)
Wabi Sabi 21© (2009)
Sly Guitar (2013)

As band member
With The Vibrators:
Pure Mania (1977)
V2 (1978)
VGuilty (1983)
Alaska 127 (1984)
Past, Present and Into the Future (2017)

With The Vibrators & Chris Spedding:
Mars Casino (2019)

With The Stranglers:
Stranglers in the Night (1992)
About Time (1995)
Written in Red (1997)
Coup de Grace (1998)

Collaborations
With Peter Gabriel:
Peter Gabriel 4 (1982)

With Peter Hammill:
Enter K (1982)
Patience (1983)
The Love Songs (1984)
The Margin (live, 1985)
Out of Water (1990) (Ellis also painted the picture on the cover)
Fireships (1992)
The Noise (1993)

With Nic Potter:
Mountain Music (1983)
New Europe-Rainbow Colours (1992)

With Judge Smith:
Curly's Airships (2000)
The Full English (2005)
Live in Italy 2005 (live, DVD, 2006)
The Light of the World (two-song CD single, 2007, as The Tribal Elders)
Orfeas (2011)

With Cult With No Name
Above as Below (2012)
Another Landing (2013)

References

External links
Chanoyu Records – official John Ellis website, includes biography and extensive discography
official John Ellis MySpace page
Luma Group
Wabi-Sabi 21©
John Ellis interviews for The Burning Up Times: Issue 2 'Second Coming' (re: stand-in for The Stranglers' Hugh Cornwell, Rainbow Theatre 1980) and Issue 4 'Ode To Joy' (re: Euroband member with The Stranglers' JJ Burnel as well as support band member of Rapid Eye Movement, Eurotour 1979) at www.strangled.co.uk

1952 births
Living people
People from Kentish Town
The Stranglers members
English rock guitarists
English songwriters
English punk rock guitarists
Musicians from London
Bazooka Joe (band) members
The Vibrators members